Verkh-Koptelka is a rural locality (a selo) in Starotogulsky Selsoviet, Togulsky District, Altai Krai, Russia. The population was 66 as of 2013. There are 8 streets.

Geography 
Verkh-Koptelka is located 27 km east of Togul (the district's administrative centre) by road. Uksunay is the nearest rural locality.

References 

Rural localities in Togulsky District